Peshkopi (Latin: Penestae) is a town located in the mountainous regions of northeastern Albania, in Dibër County. It is the capital of both the county and the district of Dibër, and is the only county regional capital in Albania which does not share its name with its county. The population at the 2011 census was 13,251.

Known for its thermal waters, year-round agriculture, and natural beauty, Peshkopi is also developing a reputation as tourism destination for outdoor activities such as hiking, camping, mountain biking, and rock climbing. The third tallest mountain in the Balkans, Mount Korabi, and the birthplace of Albania's national hero, Gjerg Kastrioti, are nearby heritages sites. The district also contains large mineral ore deposits such as chromium, sulfur, and marble. It is also an important industrial center in Albania, producing many agricultural products for Albania.

History
The name of Peshkopi is derived from the word peshkop meaning bishop in Albanian and from Episkopè in Greek. Bulgarian maps of the eleventh century  show the town under the name Presolengrad. The region of Dibër was subsumed under the Archbishopric of Ohrid in 1019, and one year later received the status of an episcopate with its center in the Bulke ward of Peshkopi, located in what is now the neighborhood of Dobrovë. The central church of the Dibër Episcopate was that of St. Stephen. The seat of the Episcopate would later be relocated, but the town of Peshkopi retained its name. Peshkopi is referenced as early as the fifteenth century under the name Peskopia.

The region today known as Dibër was inhabited in pre-Christian times by the Illyrian tribe known to the Romans as Penestae, Πενέσται in Ancient Greek.

By the beginning of the sixteenth century, the Ottoman Empire had completed its conquest of Albania. Under the rule of the Ottoman Empire, Peshkopi (then Debre-i Zir, which meant "Lower Debre" in Ottoman Turkish) was a small market town, overshadowed by the larger and more flamboyant Debar ("Greater Dibër"), which today lies just over the Macedonian border. The population of Peshkopi was almost completely Muslim by 1583. In 1873 an Ottoman barracks was built in Peshkopi, housing up to 8,000 soldiers.

The Dibër region, including Peshkopi, took part in the uprisings against Ottoman authority that were occurring throughout Albania in the early 1910s. Albanian armed bands captured Peshkopi from the Ottomans on August 16, 1912.

In the aftermath of the breakup of the Ottoman Empire, a Serbian army invaded Dibër and entered Peshkopi in early December 1912. Albanian forces retook the city on September 20, 1913. A Bulgarian army invaded Peshkopi on January 1, 1916. The Austro-Hungarian Empire, an ally of Bulgaria, brought an army to Peshkopi on April 12, 1916, and engaged in punitive house-burnings and executions throughout the region in an attempt to quell local resistance. The Bulgarians and Austro-Hungarians departed the area in September 1918.

Italian forces invaded Albania in 1939, reaching Peshkopi on April 15. Albanian Communist partisans retook Peshkopi on September 9, 1943. The following October, the partisans defeated Balli Kombëtar forces in an armed battle for control of the city. In July 1944, German forces occupied the city, but were expelled later that same month. Fighting continued in the Dibër region until early September, leaving the Communist-dominated National Liberation Army in control.

Geography 
Peshkopi is located in northeastern Albania, in the Dibër County. It is situated in the valley of the Drin river, at the foot of the Korab mountain range. The town is the administrative center of the district and has a population of around 14,000 people. The Korab mountain range, which is the highest range in the Balkans, is located to the east of the town. The Drin River, which is the longest river in the country, flows through the valley and provides water for irrigation and hydroelectric power generation. The valley is also known for its fertile soil and is an important agricultural area, producing crops such as corn, wheat, and vegetables.

Education
Peshkopi has a number of primary and secondary schools, which provide education to children in the town and surrounding areas. The schools offer a range of subjects including math, science, language, and social studies. Many of them also have extracurricular activities such as sports, music, and art programs. Overall, education is highly valued in Peshkopi and the government is continuously investing in the development of the educational system in the town.

Tertiary
Peshkopi briefly had a branch of Aleksandër Moisiu University. It was closed in 2017 by order of the national Ministry of Education for alleged failure to meet standards.

Secondary (grades 10-12)
 Said Najdeni High School
 Nazmi Rushiti Professional School

Elementary/middle (grades 1-9)
 Selim Alliu
 Demir Gashi

Tourism

The main form of tourism in the region is mountain tourism, due to the hilly terrain and large amount of forest. In the district of Dibra is home to two of the thirteen national parks in Albania, Lurë National Park, and Korab-Koritnik Nature Park which offer a variety of outdoor activities including climbing, walking, skiing, trekking, picnics, hunting, kayaking, etc.

The museum, located beside the general secondary school, houses a collection of local costumes, carpets, kitchen equipment and filigree jewelry, as well as a number of models of local architecture.

Elez Isufi Boulevard is a pedestrian-only street in the middle of Peshkopi lined with linden trees. The street is paved with stone from non-native stone from Berat. 

Thermal mineral water springs and sulphur baths in the vicinity of Peshkopi are a draw for seasonal tourism, primarily from within Albania, but also to a lesser extent from neighboring countries. They are reputed to alleviate some health issues. The baths are located a short distance east of the city, upstream along the creek which runs through the middle of Peshkopi.

Sports

The main sport played in Peshkopi is football. The city's main team is KF Korabi Peshkopi and its home stadium is Korabi Stadium with a capacity of 6,000 spectators. The multidisciplinary club's home arena is the Bashkim Lala Sports Palace, which has a capacity of over 2,000 spectators. KF Korabi currently plays in the Albanian First Division. They were runners-up in the 1961, 2015–16 Albanian First Division going in to the Albanian Superliga.

Transportation
Peshkopi is an important transportation hub, located at the crossroads of several important roads connecting Albania with Kosovo and North Macedonia. The town is served by the Rinas Mother Teresa International Airport in the capital city of Tirana, which is located around 200 km to the west of Peshkopi. There are also regular bus services connecting the town with Tirana and Durres.

Bus
Peshkopi is served by bus lines to and from Tirana and Durrës. Buses typically depart in the morning on a fixed schedule. There are also minibuses and vans serving a wider set of destinations, which depart when sufficiently full. Minibuses to Tirana and Durrës are generally somewhat more expensive than the equivalent bus route.

Highways
The main road to Peshkopi is SH6 (State Road 6). A new highway called the Arbër Highway is currently under construction and is expected to be completed in Spring 2023. The 200 km road will link Tirana with Debar, North Macedonia and will connect with SH6.

Train
There is no train service to Peshkopi.

Notable people
 Gëzim Alpion - Academic
 Cen Elezi - Bayraktar of Dibra
 Bashkim Gazidede- Politician
 Elez Isufi - Nationalist figure
 Denisa Kola - Miss Albania 2003
 Gentjan Manuka - Footballer
 Elvis Prençi - Footballer
 Symir Zuna - WWII fighter
 Qazim Laçi - Footballer
 Hasan Çipuri - Academic
 Qazim Hoxha - Military Official

References

External links
 Visit Diber Official Tourism Portal
 Municipality of Diber Official Site
  Peshkopia City Portal

Gegëri
Former municipalities in Dibër County
Administrative units of Dibër (municipality)
Towns in Albania